Pontixanthobacter aestiaquae  is a Gram-negative bacterium from the genus Pontixanthobacter which has been isolated from seawater from the Yellow Sea in Korea.

References 

Sphingomonadales
Bacteria described in 2014